In business theory, disruptive innovation is innovation that creates a new market and value network or enters at the bottom of an existing market and eventually displaces established market-leading firms, products, and alliances. The concept was developed by the American academic Clayton Christensen and his collaborators beginning in 1995,  and has been called the most influential business idea of the early 21st century. Lingfei Wu, Dashun Wang, and James A. Evans generalized this term to identify disruptive science and technological advances from more than 65 million papers, patents and software products that span the period 1954–2014. Their work was featured as the cover of the February 2019 issue of Nature  and was included among the Altmetric 100 most-discussed work in 2019.

Not all innovations are disruptive, even if they are revolutionary. For example, the first automobiles in the late 19th century were not a disruptive innovation, because early automobiles were expensive luxury items that did not disrupt the market for horse-drawn vehicles. The market for transportation essentially remained intact until the debut of the lower-priced Ford Model T in 1908. The mass-produced automobile was a disruptive innovation, because it changed the transportation market, whereas the first thirty years of automobiles did not.

Disruptive innovations tend to be produced by outsiders and entrepreneurs in startups, rather than existing market-leading companies. The business environment of market leaders does not allow them to pursue disruptive innovations when they first arise, because they are not profitable enough at first and because their development can take scarce resources away from sustaining innovations (which are needed to compete against current competition). Small teams are more likely to create disruptive innovations than large teams. A disruptive process can take longer to develop than by the conventional approach and the risk associated to it is higher than the other more incremental, architectural or evolutionary forms of innovations, but once it is deployed in the market, it achieves a much faster penetration and higher degree of impact on the established markets.

Beyond business and economics disruptive innovations can also be considered to disrupt complex systems, including economic and business-related aspects. Through identifying and analyzing systems for possible points of intervention, one can then design changes focused on disruptive interventions.

Usage history

The term disruptive technologies was coined by Clayton M. Christensen and introduced in his 1995 article Disruptive Technologies: Catching the Wave, which he cowrote with Joseph Bower. The article is aimed at both management executives who make the funding or purchasing decisions in companies, as well as the research community, which is largely responsible for introducing the disruptive vector to the consumer market. He describes the term further in his book The Innovator's Dilemma. Innovator's Dilemma explored the case of the disk drive industry (the disk drive and memory industry, with its rapid technological evolution, is to the study of technology what fruit flies are to the study of genetics, as Christensen was told in the 1990s) and the excavating and Earth-moving industry (where hydraulic actuation slowly, yet eventually,  displaced cable-actuated machinery). In his sequel with Michael E. Raynor, The Innovator's Solution, Christensen replaced the term disruptive technology with disruptive innovation because he recognized that most technologies are not intrinsically disruptive or sustaining in character; rather, it is the business model that identifies the crucial idea that potentiates profound market success and subsequently serves as the disruptive vector. Comprehending Christensen's business model, which takes the disruptive vector from the idea borne from the mind of the innovator to a marketable product, is central to understanding how novel technology facilitates the rapid destruction of established technologies and markets by the disruptor. Christensen and Mark W. Johnson, who cofounded the management consulting firm Innosight, described the dynamics of "business model innovation" in the 2008 Harvard Business Review article "Reinventing Your Business Model". The concept of disruptive technology continues a long tradition of identifying radical technological  change in the study of innovation by economists, and its implementation and execution   by its management at a corporate or policy level.

According to Christensen, "the term 'disruptive innovation' is misleading when it is used to refer to the derivative, or 'instantaneous value', of the market behavior of the product or service, rather than the integral, or 'sum over histories', of the product's market behavior."

In the late 1990s, the automotive sector began to embrace a perspective of "constructive disruptive technology" by working with the consultant David E. O'Ryan, whereby the use of current off-the-shelf technology was integrated with newer innovation to create what he called "an unfair advantage". The process or technology change as a whole had to be "constructive" in improving the current method of manufacturing, yet disruptively impact the whole of the business case model, resulting in a significant reduction of waste, energy, materials, labor, or legacy costs to the user.

In keeping with the insight that a persuasive advertising campaign can be just as effective as technological sophistication at bringing a successful product to market, Christensen's theory explains why many disruptive innovations are not advanced or useful technologies, rather combinations of existing off-the-shelf components, applied shrewdly to a fledgling value network.

Online news site TechRepublic proposes an end using the term, and similar related terms, suggesting that, as of 2014, it is overused jargon.

Definition 

 Disruption is a process, not a product or service, that occurs from the nascent to the mainstream 
 Originates in low-end (less demanding customers) or new market (where none existed) footholds
 New firms don't catch on with mainstream customers until quality catches up with their standards
 Success is not a requirement and some business can be disruptive but fail
 New firm's business model differs significantly from incumbent

Christensen continues to develop and refine the theory and has accepted that not all examples of disruptive innovation perfectly fit into his theory. For example, he conceded that originating in the low end of the market is not always a cause of disruptive innovation, but rather it fosters competitive business models, using Uber as an example. In an interview with Forbes magazine he stated:"Uber helped me realize that it isn’t that being at the bottom of the market is the causal mechanism, but that it’s correlated with a business model that is unattractive to its competitor".

Theory
The current theoretical understanding of disruptive innovation is different from what might be expected by default, an idea that Clayton M. Christensen called the "technology mudslide hypothesis". This is the simplistic idea that an established firm fails because it doesn't "keep up technologically" with other firms. In this hypothesis, firms are like climbers scrambling upward on crumbling footing, where it takes constant upward-climbing effort just to stay still, and any break from the effort (such as complacency born of profitability) causes a rapid downhill slide. Christensen and colleagues have shown that this simplistic hypothesis is wrong; it doesn't model reality. What they have shown is that good firms are usually aware of the innovations, but their business environment does not allow them to pursue them when they first arise, because they are not profitable enough at first and because their development can take scarce resources away from that of sustaining innovations (which are needed to compete against current competition). In Christensen's terms, a firm's existing value networks place insufficient value on the disruptive innovation to allow its pursuit by that firm. Meanwhile, start-up firms inhabit different value networks, at least until the day that their disruptive innovation is able to invade the older value network. At that time, the established firm in that network can at best only fend off the market share attack with a me-too entry, for which survival (not thriving) is the only reward.

In the technology mudslide hypothesis, Christensen differentiated disruptive innovation from sustaining innovation. He explained that the latter's goal is to improve existing product performance. On the other hand, he defines a disruptive innovation as a product or service designed for a new set of customers.

Christensen also noted that products considered as disruptive innovations tend to skip stages in the traditional product design and development process to quickly gain market traction and competitive advantage. He argued that disruptive innovations can hurt successful, well-managed companies that are responsive to their customers and have excellent research and development. These companies tend to ignore the markets most susceptible to disruptive innovations, because the markets have very tight profit margins and are too small to provide a good growth rate to an established (sizable) firm. Thus, disruptive technology provides an example of an instance when the common business-world advice to "focus on the customer" (or "stay close to the customer", or "listen to the customer") can be strategically counterproductive.

While Christensen argued that disruptive innovations can hurt successful, well-managed companies, O'Ryan countered that "constructive" integration of existing, new, and forward-thinking innovation could improve the economic benefits of these same well-managed companies, once decision-making management understood the systemic benefits as a whole.

Christensen distinguishes between "low-end disruption", which targets customers who do not need the full performance valued by customers at the high end of the market, and "new-market disruption", which targets customers who have needs that were previously unserved by existing incumbents.

Low-end disruption 
"Low-end disruption" occurs when the rate at which products improve exceeds the rate at which customers can adopt the new performance. Therefore, at some point the performance of the product overshoots the needs of certain customer segments. At this point, a disruptive technology may enter the market and provide a product that has lower performance than the incumbent but that exceeds the requirements of certain segments, thereby gaining a foothold in the market.

In low-end disruption, the disruptor is focused initially on serving the least profitable customer, who is happy with a good enough product. This type of customer is not willing to pay premium for enhancements in product functionality. Once the disruptor has gained a foothold in this customer segment, it seeks to improve its profit margin. To get higher profit margins, the disruptor needs to enter the segment where the customer is willing to pay a little more for higher quality. To ensure this quality in its product, the disruptor needs to innovate. The incumbent will not do much to retain its share in a not-so-profitable segment, and will move up-market and focus on its more attractive customers. After a number of such encounters, the incumbent is squeezed into smaller markets than it was previously serving. And then, finally, the disruptive technology meets the demands of the most profitable segment and drives the established company out of the market.

New market disruption 
"New market disruption" occurs when a product fits a new or emerging market segment that is not being served by existing incumbents in the industry. Some scholars note that the creation of a new market is a defining feature of disruptive innovation, particularly in the way it tend to improve products or services differently in comparison to normal market drivers. It initially caters to a niche market and proceeds on defining the industry over time once it is able to penetrate the market or induce consumers to defect from the existing market into the new market it created.

The extrapolation of the theory to all aspects of life has been challenged, as has the methodology of relying on selected case studies as the principal form of evidence. Jill Lepore points out that some companies identified by the theory as victims of disruption a decade or more ago, rather than being defunct, remain dominant in their industries today (including Seagate Technology, U.S. Steel, and Bucyrus). Lepore questions whether the theory has been oversold and misapplied, as if it were able to explain everything in every sphere of life, including not just business but education and public institutions.

Disruptive technology
In 2009, Milan Zeleny described high technology as disruptive technology and raised the question of what is being disrupted. The answer, according to Zeleny, is the support network of high technology. For example, introducing electric cars disrupts the support network for gasoline cars (network of gas and service stations). Such disruption is fully expected and therefore effectively resisted by support net owners. In the long run, high (disruptive) technology bypasses, upgrades, or replaces the outdated support network.

Questioning the concept of a disruptive technology, Haxell (2012) questions how such technologies get named and framed, pointing out that this is a positioned and retrospective act.

Technology, being a form of social relationship, always evolves. No technology remains fixed. Technology starts, develops, persists, mutates, stagnates, and declines, just like living organisms. The evolutionary life cycle occurs in the use and development of any technology. A new high-technology core emerges and challenges existing technology support nets (TSNs), which are thus forced to coevolve with it. New versions of the core are designed and fitted into an increasingly appropriate TSN, with smaller and smaller high-technology effects. High technology becomes regular technology, with more efficient versions fitting the same support net. Finally, even the efficiency gains diminish, emphasis shifts to product tertiary attributes (appearance, style), and technology becomes TSN-preserving appropriate technology. This technological equilibrium state becomes established and fixated, resisting being interrupted by a technological mutation; then new high technology appears and the cycle is repeated.

Regarding this evolving process of technology, Christensen said:

The World Bank's 2019 World Development Report on The Changing Nature of Work examines how technology shapes the relative demand for certain skills in labor markets and expands the reach of firms - robotics and digital technologies, for example, enable firms to automate, replacing labor with machines to become more efficient, and innovate, expanding the number of tasks and products. Joseph Bower explained the process of how disruptive technology, through its requisite support net, dramatically transforms a certain industry.

For example, the automobile was high technology with respect to the horse carriage. It evolved into technology and finally into appropriate technology with a stable, unchanging TSN. The main high-technology advance in the offing is some form of electric car—whether the energy source is the sun, hydrogen, water, air pressure, or traditional charging outlet. Electric cars preceded the gasoline automobile by many decades and are now returning to replace the traditional gasoline automobile. The printing press was a development that changed the way that information was stored, transmitted, and replicated. This allowed empowered authors but it also promoted censorship and information overload in writing technology.

Milan Zeleny described the above phenomenon. He also wrote that:

Social media could be considered a disruptive innovation within sports. More specifically, the way that news in sports circulates nowadays versus the pre-internet era where sports news was mainly on T.V., radio, and newspapers. Social media has created a new market for sports that was not around before in the sense that players and fans have instant access to information related to sports.

High-technology effects
High technology is a technology core that changes the very architecture (structure and organization) of the components of the technology support net. High technology therefore transforms the qualitative nature of the TSN's tasks and their relations, as well as their requisite physical, energy, and information flows. It also affects the skills required, the roles played, and the styles of management and coordination—the organizational culture itself.

This kind of technology core is different from regular technology core, which preserves the qualitative nature of flows and the structure of the support and only allows users to perform the same tasks in the same way, but faster, more reliably, in larger quantities, or more efficiently. It is also different from appropriate technology core, which preserves the TSN itself with the purpose of technology implementation and allows users to do the same thing in the same way at comparable levels of efficiency, instead of improving the efficiency of performance.

On differences between high and low technologies, Milan Zeleny wrote:

Not all modern technologies are high technologies, only those used and functioning as such, and embedded in their requisite TSNs. They have to empower the individual because only through the individual can they empower knowledge. Not all information technologies have integrative effects. Some information systems are still designed to improve the traditional hierarchy of command and thus preserve and entrench the existing TSN. The administrative model of management, for instance, further aggravates the division of task and labor, further specializes knowledge, separates management from workers, and concentrates information and knowledge in centers.

As knowledge surpasses capital, labor, and raw materials as the dominant economic resource, technologies are also starting to reflect this shift. Technologies are rapidly shifting from centralized hierarchies to distributed networks. Nowadays knowledge does not reside in a super-mind, super-book, or super-database, but in a complex relational pattern of networks brought forth to coordinate human action.

Internal auditor response

Internal audit plays a critical role maintaining effective control mitigating emerging risks. Businesses will increase risk or bypass opportunity if auditors do not address disruption-related risks.  Michael G. Alles has discussed that Big Data is a disruptive innovation that auditors must  incorporate in practice. A 2019 study, Internal Auditors' Response to Disruptive Innovation, reports on the  evolution of internal audit to react to changes. Disruptions examined include data analytics, agile processes, cloud computing, robotic process automation, continuous auditing, regulatory change, and artificial intelligence.

Proactive approach 
A proactive approach to addressing the challenge posited by disruptive innovations has been debated by scholars. Petzold criticized the lack of acknowledgment of underlying process of the change to study the disruptive innovation over time from a process view and complexify the concept to support the understanding of its unfolding and advance its manageability. Keeping in view the multidimensional nature of disruptive innovation a measurement framework has been developed by Guo to enable a systemic assessment of disruptive potential of innovations, providing insights for the decisions in product/service launch and resource allocation. Middle managers play an important role in long term sustainability of any firm and thus have been studied to have a proactive role in exploitation of the disruptive innovation process.

Examples

In the practical world, the popularization of personal computers  illustrates how knowledge contributes to the ongoing technology innovation. The original centralized concept (one computer, many persons) is a knowledge-defying idea of the prehistory of computing, and its inadequacies and failures have become clearly apparent. The era of personal computing brought powerful computers "on every desk" (one person, one computer). This short transitional period was necessary for getting used to the new computing environment, but was inadequate from the vantage point of producing knowledge. Adequate knowledge creation and management come mainly from networking and distributed computing (one person, many computers). Each person's computer must form an access point to the entire computing landscape or ecology through the Internet of other computers, databases, and mainframes, as well as production, distribution, and retailing facilities, and the like. For the first time, technology empowers individuals rather than external hierarchies. It transfers influence and power where it optimally belongs: at the loci of the useful knowledge. Even though hierarchies and bureaucracies do not innovate, free and empowered individuals do; knowledge, innovation, spontaneity, and self-reliance are becoming increasingly valued and promoted.

Uber is not an example of disruption because it did not originate in a low-end or new market footholds. One of the conditions for the business to be considered disruptive according to Clayton M. Christensen is that the business should originate on a) low-end or b) new-market footholds. Instead, Uber was launched in San Francisco, a large urban city with an established taxi service and did not target low-end customers or created a new market (from the consumer perspective). In contrast, UberSELECT, an option that provides luxurious cars such as limousine at a discounted price, is an example of disruption innovation because it originates from low-end customers segment - customers who would not have entered the traditional luxurious market.

{| class="wikitable"
|-
! Category !! Disruptive innovation !! Market disrupted by innovation !! Notes
|-style="vertical-align: top;"
| Academia
|Wikipedia || Traditional encyclopedias || Traditional, for-profit general encyclopedias with articles written by paid experts have been displaced by Wikipedia, an online encyclopedia which is written and edited by volunteer editors. Former market leader Encyclopædia Britannica ended its print production after 244 years in 2012.

Wikipedia not only disrupted printed paper encyclopedias; it also disrupted digital encyclopedias. Microsoft's Encarta, a 1993 entry into professionally edited digital encyclopedias, was once a major rival to Britannica but was discontinued in 2009.  Wikipedia's free access, online accessibility on computers and smartphones, unlimited size and instant updates are some of the challenges faced by for-profit competition in the encyclopedia market.
|-style="vertical-align: top;"
| rowspan="2" | Communication || Telephony || Telegraphy || When Western Union declined to purchase Alexander Graham Bell's telephone patents for $100,000, their highest-profit market was long-distance telegraphy. Telephones were only useful at that time for very local calls. Short-distance telegraphy barely existed as a market segment, which explains Western Union's decision to not enter the emerging telephone market. Telephones quickly displaced telegraphs by offering much greater communication capacity.
|-
|| FM radio ||AM radio
|-style="vertical-align: top;"
| rowspan="6" | Computer hardware || Minicomputers || Mainframes || Minicomputers were originally presented as an inexpensive alternative to mainframes and mainframe manufacturers did not consider them a serious threat in their market. Eventually, the market for minicomputers (led by Seymor Cray—daisy chaining his minisupercomputers) became much larger than the market for mainframes.
|-style="vertical-align: top;"
| Personal computers || Minicomputers, workstations, word processors, Lisp machines
|Personal computers combined all functions into one device.
|-style="vertical-align: top;"
| Pocket calculator|| 3.5 standard calculator||Equivalent computing performance and portable
|-style="vertical-align: top;"
| Digital calculator || Mechanical calculator || Facit AB used to dominate the European market for calculators, but did not adapt digital technology, and failed to compete with digital competitors.
|-
|Mobile Phones
|Car Phones and MP3 players
|The inherent portability of mobile phones and eventual Bluetooth integration into cars and mobile phones rendered the need for a separate car phone moot. A similar situation occurred once mobile phones gained the ability to play and store a significant number of MP3 files. 
|- style="vertical-align: top;"
| Smartphones || All prior types of rudimentary mobile phones and PDAs || Smartphones were both a revolutionary (in the mobile phone industry) and disruptive innovation (displacing PDAs) as they were: generally more capable than earlier types of mobile phones, introduced and popularized entirely new services/markets that were exclusive to smartphones, had a secondary function as a PDA, and could leverage existing cellular data services and increased computing power to connect to and use the internet to a greater extent than that of a typical PDA (which were usually reliant on Wi-Fi and retained limited computing power).
|-style="vertical-align: top;"
| rowspan="4" | Data storage || 8 inch floppy disk drive || 14 inch hard disk drive || rowspan="4" | The floppy disk drive market has had unusually large changes in market share over the past fifty years. According to Clayton M. Christensen's research, the cause of this instability was a repeating pattern of disruptive innovations. For example, in 1981, the old 8 inch drives (used in mini computers)  were "vastly superior" to the new 5.25 inch drives (used in desktop computers).

The 8 inch drives were not affordable for new desktop machines. The simple 5.25 inch drive, assembled from technologically inferior "off-the-shelf" components, was an "innovation" only in the sense that it was new. However, as this market grew and the drives improved, the companies that manufactured them eventually triumphed while many of the existing manufacturers of 8 inch drives fell behind.
|-style="vertical-align: top;"
| 5.25 inch floppy disk drive || 8 inch floppy disk drive
|-style="vertical-align: top;"
| 3.5 inch floppy disk drive || 5.25 inch floppy disk drive
|-style="vertical-align: top;"
| Optical discs and USB flash drives || Bernoulli drive and Zip drive
|-style="vertical-align: top;"
| rowspan="2" | Display || Light-emitting diodes || Light bulbs || A LED is significantly smaller and less power-consuming than a light bulb. The first optical LEDs were weak, and only useful as indicator lights. Later models could be used for indoor lighting, and now several cities are switching to LED street lights. Incandescent light bulbs are being phased out in many countries. LED displays and AMOLED are also becoming competitive with LCDs.
|-style="vertical-align: top;"
| LCD and LED displays || CRT || The first liquid-crystal displays (LCDs) were monochromatic and had low resolution. They were used in watches and other handheld devices, but during the early 2000s these (and other planar technologies) largely replaced the dominant cathode-ray tube (CRT) technology for computer displays and television sets.

CRT sets were very heavy, and the size and weight of the tube limited the maximum screen size to about 38 inches; in contrast, LCD and other flat-panel TVs are available in 40", 50", 60" and even bigger sizes, all of which weigh much less than a CRT set. CRT technologies did improve in the late 1990s with advances like true-flat panels and digital controls; these updates were not enough to prevent CRTs from being displaced by flat-panel LCD displays.
|-style="vertical-align: top;"
| rowspan="3" | Electronics || Transistor || Vacuum tube || Vacuum tubes were the dominant electronic technology up until the 1950s. The first transistor was invented by Bell Labs in 1947, but was initially overlooked by radio companies such as RCA up until the mid-1950s, when Sony successfully commercialized the technology with the pocket transistor radio, leading to transistors replacing vacuum tubes as the dominant electronic technology by the late 1950s.
|-style="vertical-align: top;"
| Silicon || Germanium || Up until the late 1950s, germanium was the dominant semiconductor material for semiconductor devices, as it was capable of the highest performance up until then. 
|-style="vertical-align: top;"
| MOSFET || Bipolar junction transistor || The bipolar junction transistor (BJT) was the dominant semiconductor device up until the 1960s. In the 1970s, the MOSFET eventually replaced the BJT as the dominant semiconductor technology. 
|-style="vertical-align: top;"
| rowspan="3" | Manufacturing  || Hydraulic excavators || Cable-operated excavators || Hydraulic excavators were clearly innovative at the time of introduction but they gained widespread use only decades after. Cable-operated excavators are still used in some cases, mainly for large excavations.
|-style="vertical-align: top;"
| Mini steel mills || Vertically integrated steel mills || By using mostly locally available scrap and power sources these mills can be cost effective even though not large.
|-style="vertical-align: top;"
| Plastic || Metal, wood, glass etc. || Bakelite and other early plastics had very limited use - their main advantages were electric insulation and low cost. New forms of plastic had advantages such as transparency, elasticity and combustibility. In the early 21st century, plastics can be used for many household items previously made of metal, wood and glass.
|-style="vertical-align: top;"
| rowspan="4" | Music and video || Digital synthesizer || Electronic organ, electric piano and piano || Synthesizers were initially low-cost, low-weight alternatives to electronic organs, electric pianos and acoustic pianos. In the 2010s, synthesizers are significantly cheaper than electric pianos and acoustic pianos, all while offering a much greater range of sound effects and musical sounds.
|-style="vertical-align: top;"
| Gramophone || Pianola
|-style="vertical-align: top;"
| Downloadable Digital media || CDs, DVDs || In the 1990s, the music industry phased out the vinyl record single, leaving consumers with no means to purchase individual songs. This market was initially filled by illegal peer-to-peer file sharing technologies, and then by online retailers such as the iTunes Store and Amazon.com.

This low end disruption eventually undermined the sales of physical, high-cost recordings such as records, tapes and CDs.
|-style="vertical-align: top;"
| Streaming video || Video rental || Video on demand software can run on many Internet-enabled devices. Since licensing deals between film studios and streaming providers have become standard, this has obviated the need for people to seek rentals at physically separate locations. Netflix, a dominant company in this market, was cited as a significant threat to video stores when it first expanded beyond DVD by mail offerings. The Netflix co-founders approached rental chain Blockbuster LLC in 2000 trying to sell their company. Blockbuster declined and ultimately ceased operation ten years later.
|-style="vertical-align: top;"
| rowspan="2" | Photography || Digital photography || Chemical photography || Early digital cameras suffered from low picture quality and resolution and long shutter lag. Quality and resolution are no longer major issues in the 2010s and shutter lag issues have been largely resolved. The convenience of small memory cards and portable hard drives that hold hundreds or thousands of pictures, as well as the lack of the need to develop these pictures, also helped make digital cameras the market leader. Digital cameras have a high power consumption (but several lightweight battery packs can provide enough power for thousands of pictures).

Cameras for classic photography are stand-alone devices. In the same manner, high-resolution digital video recording has replaced film stock, except for high-budget motion pictures and fine art. The rise of digital cameras led Eastman Kodak, one of the largest camera companies for decades, to declare bankruptcy in 2012. Despite inventing one of the first digital cameras in 1975, Kodak remained invested in traditional film until much later.
|-style="vertical-align: top;"
| High speed CMOS image sensors || Photographic film || When first introduced, high speed CMOS sensors were less sensitive, had lower resolution, and cameras based on them had less duration (record time). The advantage of rapid setup time, editing in the camera, and nearly-instantaneous review quickly eliminated 16 mm high speed film systems. CMOS-based digital cameras also require less power (single phase 110 V AC and a few amps for high-performance CMOS, direct current 5V or 3.3V and two or three amps for low-power CMOS, vs. 240 V single- or three-phase at 20-50 A for film cameras). Continuing advances have overtaken 35 mm film and are challenging 70 mm film applications.

|-style="vertical-align: top;"
| rowspan="3" | Publishing || | Computer printers || Offset printing || Offset printing has a high overhead cost, but very low unit cost compared to computer printers, and superior quality. But as printers, especially laser printers, have improved in speed and quality, they have become increasingly useful for creating documents in limited issues.
|-style="vertical-align: top;"
| Desktop publishing || Traditional publishing || Early desktop-publishing systems could not match high-end professional systems in either features or quality, but their impact was felt immediately as they lowered the cost of entry to the publishing business. By the mid-1990s, DTP had largely replaced traditional tools in most prepress operations.
|-style="vertical-align: top;"
| Word Processing || Typewriter || The typewriter has been replaced with word processing software that has a wealth of functionality to stylize, copy and facilitate document production.
|-style="vertical-align: top;"
| rowspan="7" | Transportation || Steamboats || Sailing ships || The first steamships were deployed on inland waters where sailing ships were less effective, instead of on the higher profit margin seagoing routes. Hence steamships originally only competed in traditional shipping lines' "worst" markets.
|-style="vertical-align: top;"
| Safety bicycles || Penny-farthings || Penny farthings were popular in the 1870s but rendered obsolete by safety bicycles.
|-style="vertical-align: top;"
| Rail transport || Canals, Horse-drawn vehicles || The introduction of rail transport completely destroyed horse-drawn transport especially for long distances and also freight transport by canal was nearly wiped out. Rail transport led to the introduction of the joint-stock company, railway time and ultimately time zones and also opened up new markets for wider fresh produce and perishable goods distribution. In communications, newspapers and postal services were able to offer daily services over long-distances.
|-style="vertical-align: top;"
| Effects of the car on societies, Mass automobility || Horse-drawn vehicles, Rail transport, Trams, Walking || At the beginning of the 20th century, rail (including streetcars) was the fastest and most cost-efficient means of land transportation for goods and passengers in industrialized countries. The first cars, buses and trucks were used for local transportation in suburban areas, where they often replaced streetcars and industrial tracks. As highways expanded, medium- and later long-distance transports were relocated to road traffic, and some railways closed down. As rail traffic has a lower ton-kilometer cost, but a higher investment and operating cost than road traffic, rail is still preferred for large-scale bulk cargo (such as minerals). Traffic congestion provides a bound on the efficiency of car use, so rail is still used for urban passenger transport.
|-style="vertical-align: top;"
| High speed rail || Short-distance flights || In almost every market where high speed rail with journey times of two hours or less was introduced in competition with an air service, the air service was either greatly reduced within a few years or ceased entirely. Even in markets with longer rail travel times, airlines have reduced the number of flights on offer and passenger numbers have gone down. Examples include the Madrid–Barcelona high-speed rail line, the Cologne–Frankfurt high-speed rail line (where no direct flights are available as of 2016) or the Paris–London connection after the opening of High Speed 1. For medium-distance trips, like between Beijing & Shanghai, the high speed rail and airlines often end up in extremely stiff competition.
|-style="vertical-align: top;"
| Private jet || Supersonic transport || The Concorde aircraft has so far been the only supersonic airliner in extensive commercial traffic. It catered to a small customer segment, which could later afford small private sub-sonic jets. The loss of speed was compensated by flexibility and a more direct routing (i.e. no need to go through a hub). Supersonic flight is also banned above inhabited land, due to sonic booms. Concorde service ended in 2003.
|}

Potential opportunities 

Potential threats

See also

Notes

References

 
 Daniele Archibugi, Blade Runner Economics: Will Innovation Lead the Economic Recovery?, Social Science Research Network, January 29, 2015.
 
 How to Identify and Build Disruptive New Businesses, MIT Sloan Management Review Spring 2002
 
 Christensen, Clayton M. & Overdorf, Michael. (2000). "Meeting the Challenge of Disruptive Change" Harvard Business Review, March–April 2000.
 Christensen, Clayton M., Bohmer, Richard, & Kenagy, John. (2000). "Will Disruptive Innovations Cure Health Care?" Harvard Business Review, September 2000.
 
 
 Christensen, Clayton M., Baumann, Heiner, Ruggles, Rudy, & Sadtler, Thomas M. (2006). "Disruptive Innovation for Social Change" Harvard Business Review, December 2006.
 Mountain, Darryl R., Could New Technologies Cause Great Law Firms to Fail?
 
 
 Eric Chaniot (2007). "The Red Pill of Technology Innovation" Red Pill'', October 2007.

Further reading

 
 
 Weeks, Michael (2015). "Is disruption theory wearing new clothes or just naked? Analyzing recent critiques of disruptive innovation theory" Innovation: Management, Policy & Practice 17:4, 417–428. http://www.tandfonline.com/doi/pdf/10.1080/14479338.2015.1061896
 Daub, Adrian. "WHAT TECH CALLS THINKING. An Inquiry Into the Intellectual Bedrock of Silicon Valley", 2020, also in: The Guardian, The disruption con: why big tech’s favourite buzzword is nonsense

External links

Peer-reviewed chapter on Disruptive Innovation by Clayton Christensen with public commentaries by notable designers like Donald Norman
The Myth of Disruptive Technologies . Note that Dvorák's definition of disruptive technology describes the low cost disruption model, above. He reveals the overuse of the term and shows how many disruptive technologies are not truly disruptive.
"The Disruptive Potential of Game Technologies: Lessons Learned from its Impact on the Military Simulation Industry", by Roger Smith in Research Technology Management (September/October 2006)
Diffusion of Innovations, Strategy and Innovations The D.S.I Framework by Francisco Rodrigues Gomes, Academia.edu share research
CREATING THE FUTURE: Building Tomorrow’s World
 Lecture (video), VoIP as an example of disruptive technology

Innovation
Product management
Technology by type
Risk